James Joseph McEntee (19 September 1884 – 13 October 1957) was an American machinist and labor leader who served as the second director of the Civilian Conservation Corps from 26 February 1940 until it was terminated in 1942.

Life and career
McEntee was born in Jersey City, New Jersey and trained in New York as an apprentice toolmaker. In 1911, he met machinist Robert Fechner and they became close friends and leaders in the International Association of Machinists. When Fechner was named the first director of CCC, he brought on McEntee as executive assistant director. McEntee was nominated as Director by President Franklin Roosevelt following the death of Fechner. The CCC grew under McEntee. The start of U.S. involvement in World War II led to a rapid conversion into part of the war effort.

McEntee returned to work for the International Association of Machinists. He died in Jersey City, New Jersey.

References

External links
 Civilian Conservation Corps legacy site

1884 births
1957 deaths
International Association of Machinists and Aerospace Workers people
American trade union leaders
Civilian Conservation Corps people